Pilodeudorix zelomina is a butterfly in the family Lycaenidae. It is found in the Democratic Republic of the Congo (from the eastern part of the country to Kivu and the mountains northwest of Lake Tanganyika), southwestern Uganda, Zambia and possibly Rwanda and Burundi.

References

Butterflies described in 1914
Deudorigini